Kiskunság National Park is a national park located in Danube–Tisza Interfluve mainly in Bács-Kiskun county, Hungary. It was created in 1975 and declared a biosphere reserve by the UNESCO. The park covers an area of 570 km2 and stretches across the Little Cumania (Kiskunság) region of the Great Hungarian Plain.

Features 
It is not a single territory, but comprises seven disjoint units, scattered throughout the area.

One of these is the Kiskunság's Puszta where annual events are held reviving the old pastoral life and cattle breeding customs.

Another is Lake Kolon near the town of Izsák. It is famous for its marsh tortoises, herons, expanses of untouched reeds and nine species of orchids which grow in the vicinity. An interesting natural phenomenon is the sand dunes in the vicinity of Fülöpháza. They are said to move under favourable wind conditions.

Geography 
The alkali lakes of the Little Cumania are found near Fülöpszállás and Szabadszállás. Their unique flora and fauna are of special value. Avocets, geese and black-winged stilts nest in the area. The lakes provide a temporary home for tens of thousands of migratory birds. This ornithologist paradise is also a UNESCO biosphere reserve. Lake Szelid near Kalocsa, Lake Vadkert by Soltvadkert, Lake Kunfehér and Lake Sós at Kiskunhalas are ideal spots for bathing and camping.

There are many tourist trails, study trails and lookouts, within the national park; all contributing to a unique experience of the Kiskunság. The main visitor's center of the Kiskunság National Park, called the 'House of Nature', is situated in Kecskemét.

Gallery

See also 
 List of national parks of Hungary
 Puszta

References

National parks of Hungary
Tourist attractions in Bács-Kiskun County
Protected areas established in 1975
Geography of Bács-Kiskun County
1975 establishments in Hungary
Danube-Tisza Interfluve
Ramsar sites in Hungary